William Morgan (1899–1964) was a London-born film editor and director.

Selected filmography
Storm Over Bengal (1938) (editor)
Bowery Boy (1940)
Mr. District Attorney (1941)
Secrets of the Underground (1942)
Guest Wife (1945) (editor)
Tarantula! (1955) (editor)
The Violent Years(1956) (director)

References

External links

English film editors
Film directors from London
1899 births
1964 deaths